Ivor Percy Kidd Vidler CBE (9 May 1909 – August 1976) was an Australian public servant who served as Clerk of the New South Wales Legislative Assembly.

Early life
Vidler was born in New South Wales and was educated at Newington College in Sydney from 1925 until 1928.

Public service
Vidler joined the NSW Parliament in 1928 and served in a number of positions, including Serjeant-at-Arms, before serving as Clerk of the NSW Legislative Assembly from 1967 until 1974.

Honours
Vidler was made a Commander of the Order of the British Empire in 1973 in recognition of his services to the New South Wales Parliament.

References

1909 births
1976 deaths
People educated at Newington College
Commanders of the Order of the British Empire